Manzanellidae is a fossil family of bivalves, in the order Solemyida. They were previously considered containing fossil and recent members of Nucinellidae.

Genera and species
 Manzanella Girty, 1909
 Manzanella elliptica Girty, 1909
 Manzanella cryptodentata Chronic, 1952
 Posterodonta Kauffman, 1976
 Posterodonta manihikiensis Kauffman, 1976

References

Further reading
 
 

 
Bivalve families